Rock Island Line is an album by Johnny Cash on vinyl format, later released on CD, with a few train and fun songs included of which some were from different albums before.

Track listing
Rock Island Line-2:02
Hey Porter-2:37
Brakeman's Blues (incomplete)-1:28
Train of Love-2:48
Pick a Bale of Cotton-1:58
Casey Jones-2:58
The Legend of John Henry's Hammer-8:42
Waiting for a Train-2:09
Don't Make Me Go-3:01
Time's a Wasting (with June Carter Cash)
Hey, Porter!-1:59
Wide Open Road-1:43

Credits
Johnny Cash-Guitar and Vocals
Marshall Grant-Bass
Luther Perkins-Guitar
Sam Phillps-Producer

Track information
Tracks 1 and 2 (From With His Hot And Blue Guitar)
Track 3 (From The Man In Black 1954–1958)
Track 4 (From Sings The Songs That Made Him Famous)
Track 5 (From The Very Best Of Johnny Cash)
Track 6, 7 and 8 (From Blood, Sweat and Tears)

External links

1966 albums
1970s compilation albums
Rock Island Line
Sun Records compilation albums
Albums recorded at Sun Studio
Albums produced by Sam Phillips